Workers' Voice may refer to:

Organisations
Workers' Voice (SuperPAC), an American pro-union political action committee
Workers' Awaaz or Workers' Voice, a female domestic workers' group in New York
Lutte Ouvrière (Workers' Struggle), formerly Voix Ouvrière (Workers' Voice), a Trotskyist group in France

Publications
Workers' Voice, publication of the trade union Bermuda Industrial Union
Workers' Voice, publication of the Communist Party of Turkey (Workers Voice)
Workers' Voice, former publication of the Communist Workers Organisation (UK)
Workers' Voice, publication of the Workers Organisation for Socialist Action in South Africa
Workers' Voice, publication of the Communist Party of Iran